Philip Evans (born 23 January 1950) (more commonly known as Phil Evans; born 23 January 1950) is a former Australian rules footballer who played for Geelong in the Victorian Football League (now known as the Australian Football League). He also played alongside his brother Tim Evans with the Geelong Cats.

References

External links
 

1950 births
Living people
Geelong Football Club players
Burnie Football Club players
Australian rules footballers from Tasmania